Volnoye is a rural locality (a selo) and the administrative center of Volensky Selsoviet, Kharabalinsky District, Astrakhan Oblast, Russia. The population was 2,035 as of 2010. There are 35 streets.

Geography 
Volnoye is located 49 km southeast of Kharabali (the district's administrative centre) by road. Seroglazovo is the nearest rural locality.

References 

Rural localities in Kharabalinsky District